This is a list of characters in the TV series Chaotic.

Main characters

Tom Majors

Thomas Anthony "Tom" Majors is the main protagonist. At his school, no one's a better Chaotic player than Tom. When he first heard about the real Chaotic from Kaz, he thought he was crazy until he experienced it for himself. Throughout the series, Tom learns various helpful strategies in his adventures through Perim with Kaz, Sarah, and Peyton. He used to only use OverWorlders, but has added scans of other tribes since entering Chaotic and exploring Perim, much like Kaz who uses all tribes in an UnderWorlder-dominant deck. He is always looking for BattleGear and Locations. So far, Tom has befriended many Creatures of different tribes, including his favorite OverWorlder, Maxxor. Tom lost his Maxxor card in a bet (his Maxxor for a Castle Bodhran scan) while trying to help a friend. But he gained a new scan of Maxxor after helping him regain all of his powers from the effects of the Decomposition Mugic. He later battled Codemaster Crellan for the second time and beat him, receiving a Location scan of Prexxor Chasm as a prize. His screenname in Chaotic is MajorTom, a reverse of his name, Tom Majors, which could be a possible influence from David Bowie.

In the original version of Chaotic, Tom was a blond, 12-year-old boy. His description taken from the original Chaotic website read, "Tom is a happy, good-natured 12-year-old who is curious and investigative in nature. Tom has enough faith in himself to stand up for what he believes in, but can come across as shy. In Perim, Tom is never shy. He feels respected for what he does and says. Tom is starting to gain confidence in the real world because of his victorious adventures in Perim".

Kaz Kalinkas

Kazden "Kaz" Kalinkas is the best friend of Tom Majors. He is the one who got him interested in Chaotic in the first place. He helps Tom out with setting up strategies before matches, and sometimes leads him through new areas of Perim, most likely to disaster. He seems to make deals with an UnderWorld creature named H'earring. The deal consists of Kaz bringing weird Dractyl scales or Fungus Fruits to H'earring in return for scans. Kaz's deck consists of all four tribes, but he prefers to use mostly UnderWorlders, especially his favorite, Chaor. This leads to his username throughout the series: KidChaor.

In the original Chaotic then called Grolls and Gorks, Kaz was a 14-year-old bully. The old site had the following as his bios: "Kazdan is aggressive, destructive and highly methodical. He is physically strong but immature. Kazdan is unable to understand the damage he does and, at times, can be downright malicious. He likes the world he lives in and he likes himself the way he is. Kazdan's best friends are Chaor - the leader of the UnderWorlders and the young warrior Takinom. Kazdan's enemies are Tom and the Overworlders, who hate the authoritative approach and despotic rule that Kazdan represents."

Sarah Laurence

Sarah Laurence is a friend of the main protagonist, and the only female protagonist. She normally goes on Scanquests alone in order to get powerful scans if for no other reason than to gloat. She usually finds herself saving Tom, Kaz, or Peyton at least once when she brings them with her. She probably (like Kaz and Peyton) has a mixed deck but it mostly consists of Danians. She has so far been shown playing in a battledrome once (aside from the codemaster battle scene in Battle Lessons) in the episode A Flux Too Far, in which she battles and defeats Tom in the Hotekk Drome. She has no favorite Creature in particular, but she seems to like Wamma and Valani Levaan. (She also has a tendency to show the Danian Queen much respect). Her username is ChaotiKween.

Peyton Touhey

Peyton Touhey is an eccentric Chaotic player. In one case he took a sarcastic suggestion of picking the cards with his eyes closed, and surprisingly, he won. He tells his opponents to expect the unexpected. He believes that males are better at Chaotic than females, and decides to prove so by challenging Krystella to a match, although during this battle he was playing as female creatures. Peyton's deck is most often built around Mipedians. He is also an over-eater, and many of his scenes in Chaotic display him ordering various junk food amenities from the robot waiters. Witty and mildly eccentric, Peyton's shenanigans and cheap puns often serve as a source of comedy or slapstick humor during Tom and Co.'s adventures. His favorite Creature seems to be Malvidine, and his username is PeytonicMaster.

Klay

Klaybourne is one of the main antagonists. Klay is not popular. He lies, steals and swindles newbies out of their best cards as well as grabbing any advantage over opponents that he can, but stops just short of outright cheating in matches to avoid being disqualified. He also likes to lurk in the food court and eat people's leftovers. Everyone knows Klay's a dirty slimeball, but the problem is nobody can prove it. Frankly, Klay couldn't care less what the other players think of him, and what the Code Masters don't know can't hurt him.

In Perim, Klay is no more restricted by rules than by decency. He will often follow other players to good finds before jumping in and stealing their scans. Sometimes, he even tries to get rid of rivals ("dying" in Perim results in a player's Chaotic profile being deleted).

A longtime rival of Kaz's, Klay took an instant disliking to Tom as well and has spent most of the series attempting to sabotage both of them. It's been now known that he and Krystella work for Lord Van Bloot.

He also has an Australian accent implying that he is from Australia. His appearance somewhat resembles Bono and David Bowie. His Chaotic username is Klayotic.

Krystella

Krystella is one of the main antagonists. No less underhanded than her friend Klay, but instead of human players, she fools unsuspecting Overworlders into a (usually false) trap. She then makes a trade with an Underworlder to take the captured Overworlder off her hands in return for a scan of anything that can be of use to her (creatures, battlegear and mugic). While she also holds a grudge against Tom Majors for making her miss out on a scan from Pyrithion, she sometimes prefers to mess with Peyton's head so he'll lose his concentration during a match. Somewhat similar to Klay and Kaz, Krystella uses mainly UnderWorld cards, but she will use any tribe as long as they are powerful. She has a Sister named Jycella who is much nicer than her.

Minor characters

Aggro999

Tank was Tom's opponent in The Thing About Bodal. In this battle, Tank had a battle team that included Tangath Toborn, Ulfhedinn, Raimusa, Velreth, Staluk and Blaizer. Tom had Maxxor, Gespedan, Ettala, Dractyl, Xaerv and Bodal—whom he'd promised to battle with, during his last scanquest.

At first it seems Tom's winning, after a close battle between Tank/Tangath Toborn and Tom/Maxxor, with Maxxor eventually winning; he defeats all of Tank's creatures until Tank uses a combination of Chorus of Cothica and Song of Revival Mugic to revive Tangath Toborn.

This time Tangath beats Maxxor, and Tank defeats all of Tom's creatures. Tom's last chance is in Bodal, who he'd hoped he wouldn't have to use. Tom's sure that he'll lose, but fortunately for him this battle takes place in Kiru City. Bodal knows his way around the tunnels of that location, and eventually, to everybody's surprise—and Tank's humiliation, Bodal wins the match; therefore Tom has defeated all of Tank's creatures and is declared the victor. Tank also appeared in "Trading Cards", where he (as Velreth) played against a player named Tartareker (who, obviously, used Tartarek). Tank was beaten in the Lava Pond by a Lavalanche attack.
Afterwards, Tom had to beat Tartawrecker in order to get the scan Sarah needed from Tank, he calls Tom Sarah's 'boyfriend' and Tom accepts his challenge to defeat Tartawreker in six straight wins at the BetaDrome.

Like Klay, Tank is a sore loser, as he wines when he loses and even rudely snaps at those who tries to cheer him up, such as Tom.

Battleboarder

Battleboarder (real name Drew) is a skateboarding player who was shown in "Allmageddon." Everyone wanted to battle him because his Hoton could use Allmageddon, an attack which defeated any enemy in one shot. After Tom, Kaz, and Sarah lose to him, they go to Perim to find Hoton, only to find him weakened and hopelessly trying to rebuild something. They learn from Vidav that when using Allmageddon to save his village from Underworld raiders, Hoton actually destroyed it by mistake. Later, Peyton battles Battleboarder again. Using one of his innovative strategies that Tom and co. helped him set up, Peyton beat Hoton and Allmageddon, winning the match.

According to Kaz, Drew's skills are average and he only wins due to Hoton, proven by how he doesn't defeat any of Peyton's creatures without Hoton.

His team consisted of Mezzmarr, Hoton, Blazier, Dractyl, Frafdo and Staluk. Peyton's team consisted of Ibiaan, Intress, Odu-Bathax, Marquis Darini, Zhade and Tianne.

BattleMaestro

BattleMaestro is an expert Danian player. In the episode "Going Under" he was Kaz's opponent. In a flashback, his team consists of Mallash, Lhad, Skartalas, Wamma, Junda and Ibiaan. Kaz's team consists of Toxis, Takinom, Magmon, H'earring, Zaur and Dardemus.

Bruiser33

Bruiser was Tom's opponent in Castle Bodhran or Bust Part 1. This was a wager-battle in the BetaDrome. Tom and Kaz needed the Castle Bodhran scan, to help them find ReggieOne. Bruiser refused to battle Kaz, who was more experienced than Tom, since he had an UnderWorld deck. Bruiser wanted Tom's Maxxor card.

They had a 1-on-1 battle, Tom/Maxxor vs Bruiser/Frafdo. Eventually Frafdo won, and Tom gave up his Maxxor scan.

However, when Bruiser heard that they needed the Bodhran Castle scan to help a friend, he gave them one of his scans. Since he had multiple copies of the location card, he went back and scanned it a few times. Although to keep up his reputation, Tom and Kaz aren't meant to tell anybody.

Bruiser is rude, arrogant, and is prone to gloat, with the skills to match it. He tends to prefer Overworld cards. He also doesn't wish to divulge his defeats, as he lies to his fans about losing to Reggie. However, Bruiser has a nice side as well, as he gave Tom a scan of Castle Bohdran when he learned it was to help save his friend Reggie.

Buzz Jr.

A talented, young Danian player whose father gave him strict coaching. He appeared in the episode Floundering Father as Tom's opponent.

Buzz Sr.

A talented offline player, he was a domineering coach to his son, Buzz Jr. After criticizing his son's battle techniques and insulting Tom, Kaz challenged him to a drone match. Due to his inexperience and nervousness of battling for the first time he quickly forgot everything he knew and lost all but one battle (and only winning the battle out of luck). In the end his son convinced him that it didn't matter if he wins or loses only to have fun. He appeared in the episode Floundering Father.

Chaotikings
The Chaotikings were a group of hotshot players shown in the episode named for them, "Chaotikings." They wanted to recruit Kaz into their ranks after seeing his skill.

 The first named Chaotiking to battle Kaz was Chaotiking RJ, who used a Danian Deck. Kaz defeated RJ, while only the battle between Rarran (Kaz's main creature in this episode) and Galin was shown, in which Rarran won.
 Later, Kaz battled Chaotiking Drake, the leader of the Chaotikings. Unfortunately, Kaz's interest in joining the Chaotikings prevented him from going on a scanquest with Tom, putting a rift between them. However, Tom realized Kaz would always be there for him, and skipped scanning Banshor to cheer Kaz on. Drew used a mixed army with all of the tribes. The match began with Drake's Khybon against Kaz's Rarran in Castle Pillar. Gaining the extra Mugician for wisdom, Rarran beat Khybon and Kaz defeated all of Drake's other creatures, winning the match. However, Kaz decided not to join the Chaotikings.

Code Masters
Similar to bosses of a company, the Code Masters are the bosses of Chaotic. They are all experienced players and have rare creatures that other players do not have access to. They are in charge of maintaining order in Chaotic and discipline players who cheat or cause harm to others and Perim. Each one has a Battle Drome named after them. When a player wins seven matches in a drome, the Codemaster of that Drome will challenge the player to a match. If any players defeat them, that player will get a Rare Location Scan from the Codemaster they fought, containing some of the Codemaster's signature creatures.

Codemaster Amzen

The Codemaster of the Amzen Drome.

In "Battle Lessons" Kaz states that he and Amzen fought once and he lost as Chaor when her BattleGear changed him into a "shock absorber."

Codemaster Chirrul

The Codemaster of the Chirrul Drome.

In "Battle Lessons," Sarah mentioned that she once fought Codemaster Chirrul and lost when Codemaster Chirrul used an attack that spun Sarah around. Sarah mentioned that she was still dizzy from the battle.

Codemaster Crellan

Codemaster Crellan is the Codemaster of the Crellan Drome. In Codemaster form, he wears a mask, and has a white robe with a big blue collar. He uses Tribeless creatures (Ursis, Smildon, Ariak, Proboscar, Cromaxx and Glektod) in his Codemaster matches.

He first appeared in "Battle Lessons." Following his recent loss in Drome Matches without his Maxxor card since his Drome Match against Bruiser33, Tom first encountered him in his human form. Tom later learned of his Codemaster form when he duelled him against his Ursis who defeated every one of Tom's creatures to prove that there are some matches that can be won without Maxxor.

Tom faced him again in "The Codemaster Chronicles" and managed to beat him. Codemaster Crellan rewarded him with a scan of Prexxor Chasm.

In "Chasm Quest," Smildon made a reference to Codemaster Crellan when Crellan went to scan Cromaxx.

Codemaster Crellan appeared in "A Rare Hazard" where he and Codemaster Imthor arrived and deactivated the scanners of Simon and his followers at Akarak Cavern.

In "Legions of Aa'une," Codemaster Crellan contacted Kaz wondering why Tom, Sarah, and Peyton haven't returned to Chaotic when ordered to. He reveals to Kaz that the teleporter actually prevents the players from returning to Chaotic and not to teleport them to Perim.

Codemaster Hotekk

Codemaster Hotekk is the Codemaster of the Hotekk Drome. He is very mean and stern to his opponents but does admit his mistakes when he loses to them. He uses Past Creatures in his Codemaster Battles (Ixxik, Neerig, Rav, Kkraa, Og, and Xulvux).

In "When a Codemaster Calls," Klay once impersonated Codemaster Hotekk in order to dupe Peyton into getting him those M'arrillian scans by stating that Codemasters can take on an apprentice as a reward. Tom caught on to Klay's plan and later revealed it to Peyton, Sarah, and Kaz.

In "Hotekk's Challenge," Tom fought Codemaster Hotekk after winning 7 matches in the Hotekk Drome. Tom used Maxxor's armored form and powered-up weak creatures (Hoton, Mommark, Owis, Wrenges and Ikkatosh) in his fight with Codemaster Hotekk. When Tom defeated Codemaster Hotekk's Og, its special ability brought back the defeated monsters with their health at 5%. Tom manages to defeat one of the creatures then used Terraport to transport the other monsters to a location that does 5% damage to all monsters. This gave Tom an easy victory as Codemaster Hotekk gives Tom a scan of Dranikus Threshold (which later turned out to be a portal to the past).

Codemaster Imthor

Codemaster Imthor is the Codemaster of the Imthor Drome. Codemaster Imthor is gold-plated with three large spikes on his golden helmet ascending from the top with green eyes. His robe is metallic and cylindrical and his hands are adorned with fingerless golden gauntlets.

In "Battle Lessons," Peyton mentioned that he fought Codemaster Imthor once and lost when Codemaster Imthor used a tentacled creature to destroy Peyton's creature.

In "The Codemaster Chronicles," Klay was fighting Codemaster Imthor in the Imthor Drome as Klay is defeated by a large invisible monster that Codemaster Imthor was playing as.

He officially appeared in "Fighting Friendly" when Kaz accused Tom of cheating in their match within the Imthor Drome. Codemaster Imthor was sent in to look into this. Upon learning that Tom didn't have a Hymn of the Elements in his deck as he claimed to have, Codemaster Imthor tells Tom that he will discuss this matter with the other Codemasters barring Tom from competing in the Chaotic Matches in all the dromes until further notice.

In "A Rare Hazard," the argument Tom and Kaz had turned out to be a ruse when Tom and Kaz learned from Maxxor that someone had been destroying Ultra Rare Chaotic locations causing Tom and Kaz to go to the Codemasters for help. Imthor and Crellan appeared with Kaz at Akarak Cavern and deactivated the scanners of Simon and his followers until the matter was solved.

Codemaster Oron
The Codemaster of the Oron Drome.

Codemaster Tirasis
The Codemaster of the Tirasis Drome.

CoolTom

A player who's apparently taller, cooler, and better than Tom in every way. He won over Tom's friends with his upbeat attitude and gifting them with scans. This caused Tom to worry his friends wanted CoolTom over him. Tom challenged him to a Drome Match and was on the verge of losing, until CoolTom's condescending remarks caused him to lose his cool and bet his own friends and Maxxor card to get CoolTom to leave them alone. During the last battle, CoolTom revealed he was in fact trying to steal Tom's friends, showing a hidden sinister side. After Tom defeated CoolTom in a Drome Match, Tom apologized for his behavior but was told by Kaz, Peyton, and Sarah that they preferred him over CoolTom anyway.

CoolTom uses OverWorlders.

Connor

He appeared in the episode War Beasts. He had a scan of a War Beast named Blazvatan and traded an extra scan for 20 cards in Peyton's Deck. After Peyton lost as Blazvatan, Connor told Peyton that he needed a Mipedian Conjurer to control Blazvatan and whispered to Peyton where one can be found.

His name is a play on the word "con", even when Peyton accused him of conning him into trading him the 20 cards in exchange for Blazvatan.

CounterFighter

CounterFighter is a Chaotic player that was featured in Peyton's fanfiction. Roderick Rothington is a known art forger who has fooled museums and art collectors for quite some time. An international peace organization got the evidence to put him in jail, but decide that they can use his talents. The organization's leader sends Agent Chambers and some masked agents to bring Peyton to him and brief him on the mission as Roderick says he will join them if Peyton can beat him in a Chaotic Card Battle. When Peyton and Agent Chambers arrive on Roderick's private island, they meet Roderick and are led to where he and Peyton will duel. Though Roderick defeats Peyton in a Chaotic Card Battle, Peyton finds out that his Chaotic Cards are actually counterfeit. Roderick sicks the ninjas on them which Peyton and Agent Chambers defeat. Upon Roderick escaping into his helicopter, he reveals to Peyton and Agent Chambers that he placed the island on self-destruct. As he flies off and his servants get to the boat, Peyton notices a surfboard and he and Agent Chambers ride on it onto the water as the island self-destructs. Tom, Kaz, and Sarah interrupt Peyton when they find the story is not an actual event especially on how the organization wanted Roderick to work for them. Peyton then tells them that there was a part where they come in causing the three to let Peyton continue. As the episode draws to a close, Peyton continues his story where Rothington in his helicopter swoops in to attack as an artificial shark with explosives in its gut emerges from the water.

Danian Dan

When the Drome Matches were getting uglier now that the M'arrillians were free, one of those opponents was Danian Dan. Tom, Peyton, and Sarah see him fighting a Chaotic Player with Rath'tab. He nearly defeated his opponent when using the Mindbander BattleGear, but was defeated. This however inspired Sarah and Peyton to look for the BattleGear's hiding place when Kaz ended up mind-controlled by Milla'iin.

Dwaynian

Dwayne was featured in a battle in "Buggin' Out." Only the end of the battle is shown, where Dwayne has four Danians left, and Tom only has Tangath Toborn. The location is Mount Pillar, a Danian location in the UnderWorld. So this gives Dwayne an advantage. Even though with this, Tom is about to defeat Lhad; until Dwayne uses the hive ability to joins Junda's power to Lhad. This makes way for an easy win for Dwayne.

Eddie X/ Noisemaker

A celebrity rock singer who Tom, Kaz, and especially Peyton were big fans of. He is a big fan of the game and played online while he was on tour. He battled Peyton with his favorite creature, Skreamer, which had the power to switch the battlegear of his other creatures with his own. Peyton however was too obsessed with him to actually battle, much to his disappointment, so he offered Peyton two backstage passes to his next concert on the condition that he defeated his Skreamer. Peyton accepted and after losing two creatures, he managed to defeat Skreamer and win the match by beating his other creatures first. Eddie told Peyton that he rocked and Peyton was later seen at his concert with Sarah.

Elliot

Elliot was Tom's opponent in "Out in the Cold." He comes off as the traditional super arrogant nerd that everybody would like to see put in their place. When Kaz goes off towards Scimitar Summit by way of the Kertauk Pass in order to aid Raimusa against an incoming Pyrition, Tom and the others must find a way to help him make it through the lethal shortcut. Unfortunately, nobody has a scan of Scimitar Summit. Elliot, however, has many so-called "quality" scans of the pass. When an attempted trade fails, a little goading from Sarah forces Elliot to battle Tom to prove his scans are all that they are cracked up to be. His team is Staluk, Rarran, Zalic, Ulmar, Frafdo, and Dractyl. Tom had Quadore, Drakness, Maglax, Dractyl, Toxis, and Krekk, all of which are either capable of flying or have flight battlegear, since Tom needed to be able to scope out the shortcuts fast to help Kaz. Unfortunately, Elliot was more focused on winning and proving that his scans were quality than aiding Tom (evidenced by when he tricked Tom/Drakness into believing that one of the tunnels Kaz had to take led to a pit of acid ice, allowing his Ulmar to beat Drakness, and revealing at the end that both tunnels were safe). As the match went on, Elliot began beating Tom, though only because Tom wanted to scout the location rather than win. Eventually, Elliot won, though Tom managed to find all of the safe shortcuts in time for Kaz to save Raimusa.

Groupies
There were many groupies in Battledrome of the Sexes. This was since Peyton and Krystella had a battle to decide which gender was better at playing Chaotic. Most of the boys were cheering for the male creatures, while most girls were cheering for the female creatures.

Sarah wasn't cheering on either, as she thought it was childish.

In a twist at the end, it turned out that Peyton was actually playing as the female creatures, and Krystella as the male creatures.

Fans and spectators are also often shown throughout other episodes, but they were most significant in this story.

Herculeon

Herculeon is an undefeated chaotic player who uses a pure OverWorld deck. He challenges and narrowly defeats Kaz in the episode "Over Under Rent Usunder." He only cares about destroying UnderWorld players. Despite this, he is a good sport and doesn't gloat his victory over Kaz, even telling him it was a good match.

In "Loser's Circle," Kaz managed to defeat Herculeon with a Past creature.

HotShot

In the episode "Fire Fighters" he was Kaz's opponent. HotShot fights fire attack specialists from all of the tribes except the "UnderWorlders". Word is he has a grudge for UnderWorld creatures and players who use UnderWorld creatures.

Izalizard
Izalizard is Tom's opponent in "Going Under". He is a major Mipedian player and wears a lizard hat (which he insists is Mipedian-themed headgear) which even the Drome Master makes fun of (awarding him the first attack for being brave enough to wear it). He was expecting Tom to play his Overworld deck but he instead played Underworlders.

Jycella
Jycella is Krystella's twin sister, and a "Goodie-Goodie". Klay sets the twins up to a battle to decide who the better player is, and of course he picked the creatures: Aivenna and Nivenna. During the duel between Jycella and Krystella, it turned out that Klay gave Jycella a sabotaged BattleGear so that Krystella could win. But sometimes Jycella gets overboard.

Lu2

Lu2, popularly known as "LuLu the Loser", was Peyton's opponent in "An Easy Win". She is a nervous and inexperienced player who cannot get used to being a creature in Chaotic battles, and therefore loses every time. Peyton, who is on a losing streak in Drome Imthor (Ironically, he only needed one more win there to challenge the Codemaster), decides to challenge Lulu in expectance of an easy victory. The battle begins, and Lulu's inexperience becomes apparent in the way she sets up her battle team. As Peyton defeats her creatures one by one, he becomes sorry for her and begins trying to let her win. However, she keeps losing creatures anyway due to clumsiness and bad luck. After her last creature, Takinom, defeats some of Peyton's Creatures, Lulu catches on to Peyton's act (due to his non-usage of Mugic, Invisibility, or Battlegear). The exposed Peyton then begins to play seriously, but making a stupid mistake (trying to use a Torwegg at Iron Pillar, of course resulting in his creature falling to its end) leaves him with one creature, Siado. Eventually, Takinom defeats Siado, breaking Lulu's losing streak and mortally embarrassing Peyton. After the match, Lulu approaches Peyton and thanks him for helping her get into the creature. It's hinted that she has developed a crush on Peyton.

NOTE: Lulu's screen name "Lu2" is possibly a reference to the rock band U2.

M'arrillianaire

M'arrillianaire is a Chaotic player who has a deck of M'arrillians. In "Loser's Circle," it was stated that M'arrillianaire was one of the players who have ever beaten Kaz. Kaz later challenges him to a duel with the scans of the creatures he obtained from the past.

Mattmeister

Mattmeister first appeared in "Lord of Treachery." Matt is a Chaotic player who owns a lot of Gothos Tower cards and a Lord Van Bloot card. When Chaor hired Kaz to find out what Lord Van Bloot was up to, he challenged Matt to a Chaotic Battle. When it came to Chaor fighting Lord Van Bloot at Gothos Tower, it turns out that Matt is in cahoots with Lord Van Bloot and his followers Krekk and Skithia. With Kaz's help, Chaor took down Lord Van Bloot and Takinom seized Matt, Krekk, and Skithia.

Maureen
In the episode "Trading Cards," Maureen tells Sarah that she found someone named Rouise with the Song of Mandiblore Mugic and would trade for a scan of Stone Pillar.

Mister E

Mister E first appears in his self-titled episode. Evan is a Chaotic player who was wanting to fight Tom's Maxxor. When it came to the Chaotic match, the M'arrillian Milla'iin is on Mister E's team. When Tom was defeated, Evan mentioned that he made a deal with Milla'iin who allowed Evan to scan the monsters that are under Milla'iin's mind control.

Mister E's creatures include Milla'inn, Gambreor, Asadab, Krade, Ooloo, and Ragetrod.

OverWarrior

OverWarrior was a player shown at the beginning of "Train Wreck". Only the end of the battle was shown, with his Attacat and Zalic against Kaz's Borth-Majar. Kaz attacked Attacat in Castle Mommark. Even though the combination of Borth-Majar's brains/brawn combination and Kaz's strategy threw Attacat for a loop, the plan fizzled and Attacat used his Plasmapounder (the previously unnamed rifle-shaped battlegear that fired Ektospasm-styled projectiles) to turn Borth-Majar into code, making OverWarrior the third player in a row Kaz had lost to.

PerimPrincess

Shinwan's screen name is PerimPrincess and she is a beautiful Chaotic newcomer. She caught the attention of Tom, Kaz and Peyton (and later in the episode many other male Chaotic players), who all wanted her attention. She defeated Klay in her first match using Kinnianne (an OverWorlder who can also cast Mipedian Mugic). PerimPrincess is one of the first players to have a scan of a M'arrillian named Milla'iin.

Peter Nudley
He appeared in "Trading Cards." He's a guy at Kaz's school and was going to trade his Barath Beyond for Kaz's Drakness.

ReggieOne

In "Castle Bodhran or Bust" Part 1, Kaz, while on the hunt for Dractyl scales for H'earring, finds a scanner labeled ReggieOne.

Once Tom and Kaz are back on Earth, they send out an email to find ReggieOne. They eventually meet up with him. Reggie is British, rich, and is in a wheelchair. He had an accident after he went to Chaotic and his code never came back.

In Chaotic, Reggie made a deal with Frafdo to retrieve the second half of a map that was believed to lead to the Cothica. The second half of the map was located in enemy territory, Reggie never returned and was labeled a traitor, but what really happened was Reggie was captured and imprisoned by Mipedians.

Reggie was later saved and back on Earth offered Tom a Maxxor card to replace the one he lost, but Tom refused the card deciding to scan a new one himself.

He briefly appeared in Elementary and it is shown that his Chaotic character is now in a wheelchair like his real self.

SamShady

SamShady is Tom's first opponent in "Welcome to Chaotic" Part 1 and Part 2. He fights as Takinom against Tom's Maxxor. It's a tough 1-on-1 battle for Tom, but he finally wins when he uses the mugic, Fortissimo, to make Maxxor a giant. He makes an appearance in "Stelgar Strikes" fighting as Etalla in the BattleDrome.

Befitting his screen name, Sam is an underhanded person in the show who takes losses hard, insults others, and has no problems letting other Chaotic players like Kaz be kicked out of Chaotic, describing it as "less Competition".

In "Going Under" Sam tells Kaz that Tom might be a better UnderWorld player than he is, which made him a bit jealous.

In "Earth To Kaz," Kaz ask Sam a favor for a phone number.

In "Loser's Circle," Kaz faced off against Sam Shady. He revealed that he witnessed Tom, Kaz, Sarah, and Peyton go through the portal and Dranikus Threshold. Once he did his part, Sam managed to get a scan of the monster Dregor. After beating Kaz, Sam warns Kaz that it won't be long before every other Chaotic player discovers the secrets of Dranikus Threshold.

Sam is based on a real-life person, called Arthur "Samuel" Murakami. He was one of the designers of the real Chaotic trading card game.

Sanjay97
Sanjay97 was Kaz's opponent in "The Birth of Borth-Majar." He uses a Danian Deck. When he first saw Borth-Majar in Kaz's deck, he quoted that he can't play as two Creatures. The Computer Ref tells him that Borth-Majar is considered one creature. In the first part of the battle, he managed to take out Borth-Majar. After Tom got some useful info from H'earring, Kaz as Chaor cast a Mugic to revive Borth-Majar. Kaz then had the two split up but got them back together and turned Sanjay to code.

Simon

Simon is a rogue player who destroys ultra rare locations with sonic charges so he and his partners in crime Bianca, Dimitri, and Bruno are the only ones who have them and sell them to the highest bidder. In the episode "A Rare Hazard," they demanded Tom to do an inside job in Bodal's arsenal shop and obtain more sonic charges for them where Tom was against this. Simon finds a way to frame him by showing Tom a doctored picture of him destroying a location and unless he helps, he will be known as an OverWorld traitor when the picture is shown to Maxxor.

This led to the final confrontation at Akarak Cavern (an area under Crystal Cave which has anti-gravity properties to it) when Simon and his group are setting up explosive charges. Tom, Sarah, and Peyton ended up going around deactivating the charges. When it came to the final one that is about to blow in 30 seconds, Simon and his followers tried to leave only for Kaz to arrive with Codemasters Imthor and Crellan with Codemaster Imthor stating that they deactivated their scanners until the plight is solved. Tom managed to deactivate the final explosive charge. It is unknown what happened to Simon and his followers afterwards.

Bianca

Bianca is one of Simon's followers.

Dimitri

Dimitri is one of Simon's followers.

Bruno

Bruno is one of Simon's followers who is the largest of the group.

SlickNick

SlickNick was Tom's opponent in "Shifting Sands." He plays with an OverWorld deck. His team consisted of Laarina, Ulfhedinn, Orth, Raimusa, Velreth, and Zalic. Tom's team consisted of Qwun, Tianne, Arias, Tangath Toborn, Staluk, and Dractyl. SlickNick thinks only OverWorlders are good creatures, and is disgusted when Tom includes Mipedians with OverWorlders on his team. Ironically, at the end of the match it is SlickNick's Ulfhedinn against Tom's two Mipedians, Qwun and Tianne. Tom attacks with Tianne in the Mipedian Oasis, giving Tom an advantage. Even so, Ulfhedinn manages to heavily damage and nearly defeat Tianne, but Tom surprises SlickNick with Tianne's self-sacrifice ability, which defeats Ulfhedinn and wins the match for Tom. SlickNick believed that Tom won with a cheap trick, typical for Mipedians.

Stinger
Stinger is the only Chaotic player (besides Sarah) who has a scan of a flying Danian Mandiblor named Volash. Kaz battled Stinger's flying Danian in the episode "Big Time".

Tartarecker

Tartarecker was Tom's opponent in "Trading Cards" whose battle team consists entirely of Tartarek. Tank made a bet with Tom because he had lost to Tartarecker that if he beat Tartarecker without losing a single match, he would give him his Ribbian. Tartareck attacked Xaerv and Xaerv won with some difficulty, and the final battle was Tom's Maxxor vs Tartarek, Tom won this using a Fortissimo mugic while Tartarek was in the air. Afterwards Tom got the Ribbian scan as promised.

Kaz, under secret orders, dueled against Tartarecker to check if Tartareck was a Minion. Even though Kaz lost to Tartarecker, his monster saw M'arillian Battlegear in Tartareck's Tower, therefore exposing Tartareck as a traitor of the OverWorld and a M'arillian spy.

Ulmanator
Ulmanator was Peyton's opponent at the beginning of "When a CodeMaster Calls."

Creatures

OverWorlders
The OverWorlders rule most of Perim and are depicted as mostly heroic. Most of the OverWorlders are either humanoids or humanoid animals. In the card game, their specialty is being elemental specialists, a large number of Overworlders having an "Element" that can cause extra damage when used with an attack. Their Mugic color is Blue. Among the known OverWorlders are:

 Maxxor (voiced by Sean Schemmel) - The ruler of the OverWorld tribe. He is labeled in the card game as an Overworld Hero. He is known for his courage and power. He most closely resembles a humanoid creature, & also The Incredible Hulk, & Goku. His most notable features are his green skin, the strange purple markings that cover his body, and his red tunic. He is the archenemy of Chaor. He is friends with Tom due to Tom's love of OverWorlders and the particular way in which the human idolizes him, going so far as to trust him with secret information or some missions.
 Accato - An Overworld Warrior. He is Maxxor and Prantix's teenage rebellious cousin.
 Aggroar - An OverWorld Strategist that resembles a humanoid dragon/reptilian creature.
 Aisgurr - An Overworlder
 Aivenna (voiced by Bella Hudson) - An OverWorld Hero Warrior. Aivenna is a pink humanoid creature in golden battle armor. She is the long-lost sister of Nivenna and was trained by Intress and Drabe.
 Akkrean - An Overworld Guardian Muge. He resembles a bird.
 Akwi - An Overworlder.
 Antidaeon - An Overworld Scout. He resembles a duck in a suit of armor that looks like a diving suit. Antidaeon is Mezzmarr's brother.
 Arbeid - An OverWorld Guardian.
 Arctus - An Overworld Elementalist. He resembles a badger with horns and is a squire to Heptadd.
 Arias - A humanoid ram-style OverWorld Warrior with a raging anger problem.
 Arrthoa - An OverWorld Scout.
 Attacat - An OverWorld Guardian Warrior that resembles a humanoid black panther. Attacat's special ability can move him to any available spot on the field.
 Biakan - An Overworld Caretaker that resembles a giant bird.
 Bidua - An OverWorld Scout. He resembles a Humanoid Rat.
 Blazier - An OverWorld Scout. He is a short yellow humanoid with a green cowboy hat.
 Blügon - An OverWorld Warrior that guards The Snow Peak along with his best friend, Raimusa. He looks like a blue Yeti. Any water attacks done by Blügon deal an additional 5 damage.
 Bodal - An OverWorld Caretaker that is in charge of the Overworld Arsenal and appears unable to keep a secret. Bodal's special ability enables it to gain an additional 5 wisdom for any adjacent OverWorld creatures the player controls.
 Clodor - An OverWorld Warrior. It resembles an electric monster who harness prevents him from exploding enough to destroy all of Perim.
 Crawsectus - An OverWorld Elementalist. He resembles a giant lobster.
 Dalgad - An OverWorld Elementalist Scout. He resembles a humanoid squirrel.
 Deenha - An Overworld Muge. She resembles a blue-skinned Humanoid Muge.
 Donmar - An OverWorld Caretaker. He resembles an unspecified humanoid creature. He works at deciphering Runic Grove's mysterious markings which is his devotion and dementia. His special ability enables the player to heal 10 Energy to a target creature.
 Dractyl (voiced by Jamie McGonnigal) - A birdlike OverWorlder that serves as Maxxor's messenger at times. Dractyl's special ability enables it to move to any available spot on the field.
 Drabe - An OverWorld Caretaker Muge. He resembles a humanoid white ram whose tattoos symbolize each fallen comrade of his. He helped Intress train Aivenna.
 Ebkeex - An Overworld Minion Elementalist.
 Eehrin - An Overworlder.
 Elira - An Overworlder.
 Eremia - An OverWorld Elementalist Warrior. She resembles a humanoid white fox.
 Ettala - An OverWorld warrior. Described as a one-eyed brute, he is one of Mommark's creations.
 Frafdo (voiced by Jason Griffith) - An OverWorld Guardian. He resembles a humanoid falcon who wields a bow (which he can fire plasma arrows) and is also wearing his Evergreen Tunic. Frafdo's special ability enables him to gain 5 courage for any adjacent OverWorld creatures the player controls.
 Garv - An OverWorld Caretaker that watches over Lake Morn. He resembles a humanoid manatee. Garv's special ability enables the player to flip the target BattleGear face-up or face-down.
 Gharnet - An OverWorld Warrior.
 Gespedan - An OverWorld Scout that resembles a humanoid gazelle. Gespedan's special abilities enable it to gain 5 speed for any adjacent OverWorld creatures the player controls and can move to any available spot on the field.
 Gimwei - An OverWorld Elementalist. It resembles a flying squirrel.
 Gronmor - An OverWorld Guardian. He resembles a blue humanoid salamander.
 Gruenath - An Overworlder.
 Heptadd (voiced by Mike Pollock) - An OverWorlder that can use Mugic from any tribe and has mastered the use of all Elements. He is rumoured to have connections to the Cothica. It is later revealed that he came from the Spiritlands and that his Talazar Crown is what keeps him solid.
 Herken - An Overworld Caretaker. It resembles a plantlike octopean creature.
 Hifdan - An OverWorld Scout that is often mistaken for an UnderWorlder.
 Hoton - An OverWorld Strategist. He resembles a humanoid owl with the hunchback.
 Hune Canin - An OverWorld Muge. He resembles a humanoid fox in a yellow hooded robe. Hune Canin is the father of Kinnianne.
 Hune Marquard - An OverWorld Muge that resembles an insectoid creature. He is the foremost authority of Danian Mugic where he seeks to unlock their mysteries and how to exploit them.
 Hune Platinin - An OverWorld Caretaker. His special ability is when an opposing non-OverWorld Creature loses a Mugic Counter, he can heal 10 damage to the target creature.
 Ikkatosh - An Overworld Elementalist. He resembles a huge talking tree.
 Illiar - An OverWorld Warrior. He resembles a humanoid gorilla with four arms.
 Intress (voiced by Rachael Lillis) - A female, tigerlike OverWorld Elementalist. She once stopped an invasion force from the UnderWorld by herself and has a secret bond with Chaor's most faithful companion Takinom. Intress' special ability enables the creatures the player controls to gain 5 energy for each elemental type they have.
 Iparu (voiced by Gary Mack) - A shapeshifting OverWorld Elementalist that makes his home in a hidden oasis in the desert. His special ability is that when he's destroyed, he can bring back the creatures that were destroyed with their attack power being at 9.
 Issaley - An Overworld Caretaker. He resembles a Chinese dragon in water form.
 Jaidwarl - An OverWorld Elementalist that resembles a humanoid Griffin.
 Kalt - An OverWorld Elementalist Muge. He resembles a blue-skinned humanoid with antlers.
 Karraba - An Overworld Muge. He resembles a pale-skinned humanoid.
 Katarin - An Overworld Elementalist. She resembles a humanoid gazelle.
 Kinnianne - A female foxy OverWorlder that serves as the Ambassador to the Mipedians. Being an Ambassador to the Mipedians, Kinnianne's special ability enables her to cast Mipedian Mugic.
 Laarina - An OverWorld Scout that resembles a mantis.
 Loderool - An Overworld Warrior. He resembles a humanoid bison.
 Lomma - An OverWorld Guardian that resembles a humanoid antelope. Her family was killed when she was a child and vowed that no harm will come to her tribe again.
 Lujah - An Overworlder.
 Lystone - An OverWorld Muge that resembles a fairy. During the M'arrillian Invasion, Lystone was among the creatures that got taken over by the M'arrillians.
 Maglax (voiced by Wayne Grayson) - An OverWorld Guardian with a magnetic personality that is one of Mommark's creations. He resembles a robotic humanoid battery. His special ability is that he can deal an addition 5 damage in any Earth-based attacks.
 Mezzmarr (voiced by Dan Green) - An OverWorld Scout that lives in Lake Ken-I-Po. He resembles a part-man, part-eel creature. Mezzmarr is Antidaeon's brother.
 Mommark - An OverWorld Caretaker that creates other Creatures from DNA samples collected by his servants. The list of his creations includes Staluk, Maglax, and Ettala as well as UnderWorlders Ghuul, Rarran, Stelgar, and Zaur.
 Najarin (voiced by Marc Thompson) - A wise mugic-using OverWorlder labeled in the card game as an OverWorld Muge. He appears as a tall humanoid Muge with blue skin, wearing pants and with a long white beard that covers his torso. He is hinted to be more than 1000 years old (which may or may not be uncommon for the creatures of Perim) as he is quoted as saying "Yes, Chaor's ancestor was one of the greatest OverWorlders of all time. I'm proud he was my friend, despite what he ultimately became". Najarin's special ability enables the player to return a target Mugic Card from the graveyard to their hand.
 Nebres - An Overworld Warrior. He resembles a humanoid pig in a cowboy outfit.
 Neffa - An OverWorld Strategist. He resembles a humanoid bison in a red robe.
 Okaxor - An Overworld Caretaker. He resembles a humanoid elephant.
 Olkiex - An OverWorld Strategist. He is a four-armed beaver-style creature that works as Bodal's assistant. Olkiex's special ability enables the player to flip a face-up target BattleGear face-down.
 Orth - An OverWorld Elementalist. He resembles a red rock monster.
 Owis (voiced by Michael Sinterniklaas) - An OverWorld Guardian that resembles a humanoid goat. Owis' special ability enables him to heal 10 energy to himself and 5 energy to a target creature.
 Porthyn - An OverWorld Guardian. It resembles a shadow monster.
 Prantix - An Overworld Caretaker. He resembles a green elf with red spikey hair. He is Maxxor and Accato's crazy cousin.
 Psimion - An OverWorld Strategist that resembles an unspecified primate with three eyes and tentacles for limbs. His special ability enables him to gain 5 wisdom for every adjacent OverWorld creature the player controls.
 Quadore - An Overworld Muge. She resembles a butterfly-style fairy. She does not get along well with Lystone.
 Raimusa - An OverWorld Warrior that helps guard his house on Scimitar Peak. He appears as a blue animalistic humanoid dressed in samurai armor with a Japanese accent.
 Raznus (voiced by David Wills) - A wolflike OverWorlder that serves as the Ambassador to the Danians. He is one of Maxxor's oldest friends. In his youth, Raznus once taught Maxxor a valuable lesson about waiting and listening rather than using violent action. Being an Ambassador to the Danians, Raznus can prevent a Danian from being targeted by Mugics or a creature's special ability. He also allows Danians to cast OverWorld Mugic.
 Rellim - An OverWorld Caretaker. He resembles a one-eyed purple humanoid. His special ability enables him to gain 5 courage for every adjacent OverWorld creature the player controls.
 Rhaden (voiced by David Zen Mansley) - A blue-cloaked masked OverWorlder.
 Silchaw - An OverWorld Elementalist. He resembles a humanoid rat dressed as a miner. He has a talent of picking up the scent of Vlarium.
 Simalin - An Overworld Elementalist Warrior. She resembles a creature exactly like Unda.
 Sluhrk - An evil, ruthless OverWorld Guardian that resembles a scorpion.
 Somnort - An OverWorld Guardian Warrior.
 Staluk - An OverWorld Warrior that was one of Mommark's successful creations. He is intended to destroy any trespassers in OverWorld territory. It resembles an Equitaur (a centaur with a horse's head). Staluk's special abilities enable him to do an additional 5 damage for each Earth attack and can move to any additional spot on the field.
 Sukoval - An Overworld Elementalist. He resembles a snake but with hands.
 Tangath Toborn (voiced by Dan Green in most episodes, Marc Diraison in "Battle Lessons") - A humanoid lionlike OverWorlder who is the second-in-command of the OverWorld. He was believed to be the next leader, but had presumably perished while preventing the Glacier Plains from melting into a tsunami that would have ultimately flooded Perim. It is later revealed that Tangath Toborn came from the Spiritlands and that his Sword of Khy'at kept him solid. Maxxor had to break his Sword of Khy'at in order to free Tangath Toborn from his frozen imprisonment and have him defeat Vitog. When Vitog was defeated, Tangath Toborn returned to the Spiritlands. Tangath Toborn's special ability enables him to heal 10 energy to himself.
 Targubaj - An OverWorld Muge that resembles a humanoid ape. Targubaj's special ability enables him to heal 10 energy to any target creature.
 Tartarek (voiced by Dan Green) - A turtle-style OverWorlder. During the "M'arrillian Invasion," he fell under the control of the M'arillians in secrecy until Kaz's match with Tartawrecker helps Najarin expose him in front of the Tribal Alliance as one of the M'arrillian's victims.
 Thonder - An Overworlder that resembles a humanoid amphibian.
 Trimdaal - An OverWorld Minion Elementalist.
 Ulfhedinn - An OverWorld Warrior that resembles an anthropomorphic tiger with a helmet and red stripes.
 Unda (voiced by Lisa Ortiz) - An OverWorld Elementalist who is a "Servant of Water." She resembles a humanoid water creature.
 Velreth - An OverWorld Warrior that resembles a green humanoid rhinoceros. Velreth's special ability enables him to move to any available spot on the field.
 Vidav (voiced by Michael Alston Baley) - An OverWorld Muge who resembles a humanoid white tiger in a purple hooded robe. Vidav dreams that one day all the tribes will learn to live in peace and end the senseless war. He is best friends with Hoton and regrets what has happened to him. It is revealed Vidav had recently begun taking Hoton to Castle Bohdran and using his magical abilities to restore his strength. Vidav's special ability enables him to heal 15 energy to a targeted creature.
 Viqtarr - An OverWorld Strategist that resembles a humanoid grizzly bear.
 Wrenges - An OverWorld Muge. He resembles a centauroid unicorn.
 Wytod - An OverWorld Muge that resembles a humanoid deer. He is known for saving Maxxor and Najarin twice. When Wytod is sacrificed, the player chooses a new target for a target Mugic which only targets a single creature.
 Xaerv - An OverWorld Scout that spies on other tribes. He lives in the Storm Tunnel and specializes in air attacks. Xaerv is also very naive.
 Yokkis - An OverWorld Hero who only wants to have fun. He always makes "jokes" on other creatures but takes it too far. Tharax has been pranked by him for too long and will do anything to destroy Yokkis. Yokkis' special ability enables him to increase the courage, power, wisdom, and speed of any OverWorld creatures.
 Zalic - An OverWorlder who guards The Passage (the area that links the OverWorld with the UnderWorld). He is a blue humanoid who has a Hercules Beetle-style head. Zalic's special ability enables him to heal 15 energy to himself.

Past OverWorlders
 Abohan - A Past OverWorlder who was an adviser to Kiru. He resembles a Diatryma.
 Afjak (voiced by Sean Schemmel) - A Past OverWorld Muge who was the son of Najarin and his apprentice. He learned the secret of Dranikus Threshold and disappeared to an unspecific point in time.
 Gullo - A Past OverWorlder.
 Kkraa - A Past OverWorld Warrior that resembles a reptilian-faced Euoplocephalus.
 Korg - A Past OverWorld Guardian. He resembles a wood monster with leaves on him. He is the ancestor of Ikkatosh.
 Kor-bek - A Past Overworlder that was once a fearsome pirate. He is the ancestor of Owis.
 Og - A Past Overworld Warrior. He resembles a creature crawling like a slug. Og's special ability is that when he gets coded, he can bring back any of his creatures that have been coded from previous battles, but they only come back with 5 energy each.
 Quisk - A Past Overworlder that resembles an aye-aye.
 Rav - A Past Overworlder Elementalist. He is the ancestor of Xaerv.
 Rokkus - A Past OveWorlder.
 Sped - A Past Overworlder who resembles Gespedan (as he may be his ancestor).
 Vlar (voiced by Jamie McGonnigal) - A Past OverWorlder thief that discovered the Vlaric Shard. Vlar's special ability is that in the event that he is unequipped, he can swipe the BattleGear equipped from the engaging creature. He is the ancestor of Maxxor whose family for some unknown reason became the rulers of the OverWorld.
 Woost - A Past OverWorlder.

UnderWorlders
The UnderWorlders rule most of Perim's UnderWorld, are often depicted as villainous and have monstrous appearances. In the card game, their specialty is their "Intimidate" ability which can decrease their opponent's stats. Their Mugic color is Red. Among the known UnderWorlders are:

 Chaor (voiced by Marc Thompson) - The ruler of the UnderWorld tribe, labeled in the card game as an Underworld Conqueror Warrior. He appears as a giant red muscular humanoid Dragon, with blue horns jutting out of his body from his head, spikes on his back, and hooflike shoes. He is the archenemy of Maxxor. Chaor is the descendant of Kiru who was one of the greatest OverWorld leaders to ever live, though for unknown reasons he turned and became an UnderWorlder. Chaor is determined to conquer all of Perim, but none more so than the OverWorld. He dreams of conquering Kiru City and defeating his enemy Maxxor. He has an unusual friendship with Kaz, though he does occasionally protect the human from danger.
 Agitos (voiced by Mike Pollock) - A Chinese Draconic UnderWorlder that is a loyal adviser to Chaor. Agitos also serves as the announcer at matches in the UnderWorld Colosseum. He is famous for using tales of his great deeds to bolster the morale of UnderWorld soldiers. However, his many deeds are open to debate as to their authenticity.
 Anarkiar - An UnderWorld Warrior.
 Aokua - An Underworld Commander. He resembles a large black dragon with yellow spikes running down his back.
 Asadab - An UnderWorld Muge. During the M'arrillian Invasion, Asadab is among the UnderWorlders that fell under the mind control of Milla'iin.
 Atrapol - An UnderWorld Warrior who is a general of Lord Van Bloot's army. He resembles a full-armored warrior. Atrapol's special ability enables him to destroy a target engaging creature's BattleGear if he wins a Power Challenge.
 Banshor - An Underworld Ethereal. He resembles a ghost.
 Barath Beyond - An UnderWorld Ethereal Warrior.
 Blaaxa - An UnderWorld Ethereal Minion.
 Bladez - An UnderWorld Minion Warrior.
 Borth-Majar - An UnderWorld Commander. They are two UnderWorlders that work as one. Borth is a small green creature that is incredibly smart but lacks the strength of even the most common creatures. Majar is a giant rock monster and is incredibly strong but "can't even remember his own attacks." When the two of them worked together, they are an unstoppable force. But when Kaz plays as Borth-Majar, he splits up to cover more ground but it apparently "split his mind in two." They are seen in "The Final Stand" Pt. 2 in Kiru City when fighting off the M'arrillians.
 Brimflame - An UnderWorld Taskmaster Minion.
 Cerbie (voiced by Tom Wayland) - An UnderWorld Taskmaster that resembles a Cerberus.
 Chargola - An UnderWorld Commander who is known for his meticulous planning.
 Cyrenox - An UnderWorld Warrior. He resembles a skeleton warrior riding a skeletal creature.
 Dardemus - An UnderWorld Taskmaster who works as the warden at "The Pits." He resembles a large, overweight green ogre.
 Dindyon - An UnderWorld Commander that resembles a humanoid lizardman.
 Drakness - An Underworld Ethereal. He resembles a black shadowy ghost who can hide in the shadows of his enemies.
 Droll - An UnderWorld Caretaker Warrior.
 Dyrtrax - An UnderWorld Scout that guards the valuable treasures at Jade Pillar. It resembles an unspecified creature that looks like a rock star.
 Eximiar - An UnderWorld Warrior. He resembles an unspecified centauroid creature with pawed front legs and hoofed back legs. Eximiar's special ability is that when engaged with an UnderWorld Creature, he gains 5 fire and 5 recklessness.
 Galmedar - An UnderWorld Commander. It resembles a full-armored warrior in a red cape. Galmedar is a prominent member of the Gothos Phalanx, the personal guard of Lord Van Bloot.
 Gambreor - An UnderWorld Taskmaster. He resembles a reptilian troll. During the M'arrillian Invasion, Gambreor is among the UnderWorlders that fell under the mind control of Milla'iin.
 Geltod - An UnderWorld Muge. It resembles a humanoid slime creature with small heads on its tentacles.
 Getterek - An UnderWorld Taskmaster that resemble an orange, four-armed reptilian creature.
 Ghuul - An UnderWorld Taskmaster created by Mommark. It resembles a humanoid stag beetle-style creature.
 Grook - An UnderWorld Taskmaster that works as a prison guard at "The Pits." He resembles a large, round sharklike creature with arms and legs. Grook is also a famous battle trainer and many of the Underworld's best warriors owe their skills to his intensive training regime. Grook often asks his former pupils to fill in for him when he needs to carry out missions for Chaor.
 Hammerdoom Chantcaller - An UnderWorld Warrior that wields a large battle hammer called The Doomhammer.
 H'earring (voiced by Marc Thompson) - A bipedal gremlin-styled UnderWorlder who assists Kaz with scanquests. Listed in the card game as an Underworld Scout. His most notable feature are his big ears which can reach down to his knees. This also makes him vulnerable to sonic attacks. He has a taste for gross and disgusting food like Dractyl's old dead scales. H'earring's special ability enables the player to look at the top 3 Location Cards in the target Location Deck and put them back in any order.
 Illazar - An UnderWorld Muge. It resembled a multicolored humanoid.
 Ilx - An UnderWorld Ethereal. It resembles a large white ghost with four eyes.
 Irsenog - An UnderWorld Warrior.
 Jiggorex - Not much is known about Jiggorex, but he is mostly found with Khybon whom he is possibly an assistant of.
 Kamangreth - An UnderWorld Commander that is half-woman, half-centipede. Her special ability enables her to deactivate a Danian's Hive ability.
 Kerric - An UnderWorld Scout. He resembles a humanoid dragonfly.
 Ketacc - An UnderWorld Warrior Scout that is covered in quills.
 Khybon (voiced by Kevin Kolack) - An UnderWorld Warrior who builds and designs BattleGear in his forge making him the UnderWorld's blacksmith. He has yellow skin and four arms, where only one of which has one real hand while the rest have all been replaced with tools to aid him in his work. He is often seen at "Iron Pillar" where he works in the forges.
 Klasp - An UnderWorld Taskmaster that resembles a round creature with arms and legs, sharp teeth, and has eyes in his mouth. Klasp's special ability enables it to deal 5 damage to himself when he makes an attack. He can also be sacrificed to deal 10 damage to the opponent creature.
 Klawam - An UnderWorld Taskmaster.
 Kopond - An UnderWorld Muge.
 Kraade - An UnderWorld Minion Scout.
 Kreaal - An UnderWorld Ethereal Warrior.
 Krekk - An UnderWorld Commander Scout that is loyal to Lord Van Bloot. He resembles a one-eyed gargoyle. Krekk's special abilities cause the target engaging creature to lose 10 power until the end of combat and enable Krekk to move to any available space on the field.
 Kughar - An UnderWorld Taskmaster. He resembles a green-skinned humanoid with spikes on his shoulders and back.
 Lord Van Bloot (voiced by David Zen Mansley) - An UnderWorld Conqueror Muge who is Chaor's second-in-command. He resembles a harpy/skeleton creature with a mechanical eye. He has plans to overthrow Chaor. Lord Van Bloot makes his home in Gothos Tower where he can use his invisibility.
 Lyssta - An UnderWorld Conqueror Warrior.
 Magmon (voiced by Eric Stuart) - An UnderWorld Elementalist that resembles a lava monster.
 Miklon - An UnderWorld Taskmaster. He resembles an unspecified green-skinned whalelike creature that works as a prison guard at "The Pits." Following an "accident" that cost him his legs, Khybon forged the gyropod that keeps Miklon on patrol of "The Pits."
 Mishmoshmish - An UnderWorld Scout.
 Narfall - An UnderWorld Elementalist. It resembles an unspecified humanoid creature in a hooded cape with the hood covering the eyes.
 Nauthilax - An UnderWorld Elementalist. It resembles an unspecified aquatic creature with large suckers at the end of his limbs. He is often used by Chaor when it comes to spying underwater.
 Nivenna (voiced by Bella Hudson) - An UnderWorld Conqueror Muge. She resembles a gray-skinned humanoid with red hair, long ears, and wears a black cloak. She is the long-lost sister of Aivenna and was trained by Takinom.
 Ooloo - An UnderWorlder that resembles a lava monster. During the M'arrillian Invasion, Ooloo fell under the mind control of Milla'iin.
 Opto - An UnderWorld Scout that resembles a long-necked creature with five eyes that can hypnotize anyone. His special ability enables any scouts the player controls to gain "immunity to invisibility."
 Ornathor - An UnderWorld Taskmaster that resembles an unspecified amphibious creature with long jagged spikes that run down his back to the tip of his tail.
 Ozlai - An UnderWorld Taskmaster Scout. It resembles a short Fire Goatlike creature with fiery hair.
 Piddan - An UnderWorld Taskmaster Warrior.
 Pyrithion - An UnderWorld Warrior with a human torso and arms and the head and tail of a cobra.
 Ragetrod (voiced by Eric Stuart) - An UnderWorld Warrior that resembles a humanoid Orthrus with four arms and one of the heads wears an eyepatch. During the M'arrillian Invasion, he is among the UnderWorlders that fell under the mind control of Milla'iin. Ragetrod's special ability enables the player to relocate a target opposing unengaged Creature into an unoccupied space adjacent to it.
 Rarran - A batty Underworld Scout. Rarran is said to work at "The Pits" and fight on the frontlines. Rarran has numerous friends though unknown to them, Rarran is actually one of Mommark's creations. He escaped soon after he was created swearing revenge against Mommark. He joined the UnderWorlders in hopes that they would help him achieve his goal. During the M'arrillian Invasion, he fell victim to the M'arrillians. Rarran's special ability enables him to move through any occupied spaces.
 Rothar - An Underworld Warrior. Basically a minotaur though he has one thumb and two fingers per hand. Proud, boastful, and something of a jerk, Rothar is still a great warrior and will put his life on the line for those he considers his friends. Of all the UnderWorlders, Rothar is considered the most honorable.
 Savista - An UnderWorld Elementalist.
 Screamer - An UnderWorlder that resembles a horned humanoid with white and light blue pupils, a horn and has a special ability to borrow battlegear from others on his team.
 Seeryn - An UnderWorld Elementalist who is a "Servant of Fire." It resembles a fiery lava monster with fiery wings.
 Skithia (voiced by Veronica Taylor) - An UnderWorld Commander that is loyal to Lord Van Bloot. Skithia's most distinct features are her dark clothes, pale skin and blue fire. She is said to be a rival of Takinom. Skithia's special ability enables her to do an additional 5 damage for every fire attack.
 Skreeth - An UnderWorld Warrior that resembles a humanoid skeleton creature with a skeletal tail instead of legs.
 Slufurah - An UnderWorld Muge.
 Solvis - An UnderWorld Taskmaster that is a four-legged creature with one center eye and a mouth on a stalk above the eye.
 Spyder - An UnderWorlder. He resembles a large spiderlike creature.
 Stelgar - An UnderWorlder created by Mommark. He looks like a starfish. It grows into a gigantic size when dry and exposed to the sun.
 Strikto - An UnderWorld Warrior that resembles a giant two-headed serpent with one head at each end of his serpentine body.
 Swassa - An UnderWorld Warrior with four arms.
 Takinom (voiced by Eva Christensen) - An UnderWorld Warrior that protects the capital city of the UnderWorld, and is seen as being one of Chaor's advisers. She appears as a bat-winged humanoid with clawed feet and hands. She has a fierce rivalry with Intress and is mentioned to dislike Skithia due to Skithia's loyalty to Lord Van Bloot. Takinom's special ability enables the player to sacrifice an UnderWorld creature to restore her health by 25. For reasons that were never explained, Takinom is depicted with red skin in the show's first season and yellow skin in the second and third seasons.
 Tasqa - An UnderWorld Taskmaster Scout.
 Tharax - An UnderWorlder that protects the entrance to the UnderWorld. Tharax looks like a shelled crab with a mushroom on his head.
 Toadore - An UnderWorld Taskmaster. He resembles a horned toad.
 Tomugar - An UnderWorld Minion Muge.
 Torrna - An UnderWorld Scout.
 Toxis - A giant, foul-smelling, frog-style UnderWorld Elementalist that lives in "The Pits."
 Uksum - An UnderWorld Ethereal Minion Warrior.
 Ulmar - An UnderWorld Conqueror. It resembles a green-skinned midget with pointy ears and an exposed brain. He serves as Chaor's scientist that creates the Underworld's BattleGear. He is responsible for most of the UnderWorld's most powerful BattleGear including the Vile Driver (a tall two-legged transport with dual fire cannons).
 Ultadur - An UnderWorld Commander whose super speed rivals Gespedan.
 Ustabe - An UnderWorld Ethereal Warrior. It resembles a fire monster in brown and gold armor.
 Vyll - An UnderWorld Muge. It resembles a vulture-headed creature.
 Xield - An UnderWorld Elementalist. It resembles a turtle/insectoid creature.
 Zalvar - An UnderWorlder that protect the entrance to the UnderWorld. Zalvar looks like a blue and violet wolverine.
 Zamool - An UnderWorld Conqueror who serves as Lord Van Bloot's enforcer.
 Zapetur - An UnderWorld Commander. He resembles a giant lava monster. Zapetur's special ability enables the player to sacrifice a BattleGear to deal 5 damage to a target creature. Zapetur can also be sacrificed to destroy a target BattleGear.
 Zaur - An Underworld Warrior created by Mommark. It resembles an Ankylosauric creature.

Past UnderWorlders
 Kiru - Kiru is a legendary OverWorlder and Chaor's ancestor. He is depicted as one of the greatest leaders in OverWorld history, enough so to have the capital city of the OverWorld named after him. His history of events are not immediately clear as for unknown reasons, he had turned into an UnderWorlder. He resembles a purple version of Chaor with the facial features and feet of Maxxor.
 Brrug - A Past Underworlder who is the inventor of the Flux Bauble.
 Draagen - A Past Underworld Conqueror that resembles a fiery dragonoid.
 Kaal - A Past UnderWorld Conqueror. He resembles a giant lava monster. Kaal was responsible for enslaving some of Kiru's people in his mines and is probably Magmon's ancestor.
 Neerig - A Past UnderWorlder. He resembles a larger version of H'earring due to the fact that he is H'earring's ancestor. Similar to Kiru, he was also an OverWorlder before he became an UnderWorlder.
 Skorblust - A Past UnderWorld Elementalist. It resembles a tar monster.
 Volcarv - A Past Underworld Conqueror. It resembles a fire monster.
 Voorx - A Past UnderWorld Elementalist that resembles a water monster. He resides in the geysers near Ancient Kiru City as those that live there end up having to appease Voorx with the right gifts so that Voorx can keep the UnderWorlders from passing.
 Xulvux - A Past UnderWorld Ethereal Elementalist that resembles a blue reptilian-faced, ghostly monster with three horns on its head and is probably Ilx's ancestor.

Mipedians
The Mipedians are a tribe of reptilian warriors and dragonoids, most of which are friends with Peyton. They live in the desert that surrounds the Mipedim Oasis. They are led by an as-yet-unidentified reclusive king who rules through the aid of his son the crown prince Iflar. The Mipedians master natural Invisibility and are remarkable melee artists. In battle the Mipedians commonly use Speed, the Air Element, and gargantuan Warbeasts summoned by Mipedian Conjurers. In the card game, their specialty is their "Invisible" ability, which can allow them to attack first as well as provide extra damage to that first attack. Their Mugic color is Yellow. Among the Mipedians are:

 Theb-sarr - The original leader of the Mipedians. Like many rulers of the Mipedians, they all went into exile which is a rite that a Mipedian ruler must go through. His son Prince Iflar has been in his place since. Theb-sarr is described as a blue humanoid dragon with a dark blue dreadlocked mane. He is also the uncle of Prince Mudeenu.
 Abin-Wor - A Mipedian Conjurer.
 Adomo - A Mipedian Conjurer who learned the old Mipedian Warbeast conjuring and learned how to control them.
 Ailav - A Mipedian Conjurer Warrior.
 Akkalbi - A Mipedian Muge.
 Alazdan - A Mipedian Muge.
 Appelai - A Mipedian Conjurer.
 Ario (voiced by Dan Green) - A Mipedian Royal Warrior.
 Arkanin - A Mipedian Muge.
 Biondu - A Mipedian Elite.
 Bivike - A Mipedian Scout.
 Blazvatan - A Mipedian Warbeast. It resembles a humanoid lizard with tornadoes surrounding his arms and legs.
 Brathe - A Mipedian Elite.
 Bylkian - A Mipedian Royal Conjurer.
 Dakkamal - A Mipedian Elite. During the M'arrillian Invasion, he and his Acolytes got taken over by Ihun'kalin.
 Dibanni - A Mipedian Muge.
 Drimeese - A Mipedian Conjurer.
 Ebberim - A Mipedian Stalker.
 Ebbikka - A Mipedian Scout.
 Enre-Hep - A Mipedian Muge. Known as the "High Muge of the Desert", Enre-Hep is the most powerful Muge of the Mipedian tribe.
 Epaluo - A Mipedian Stalker Warrior.
 Epitrinne - A Mipedian Muge.
 Ere - A Mipedian Warbeast
 Fasseph - A Mipedian Warrior who is a master craftsman. His repairs are better than the originals.
 Fazkaal - A Mipedian Muge.
 Fivarth - A Mipedian Conjurer.
 Gaffat-ra - A Mipedian Warbeast.
 Ghatup (voiced by Darren Dunstan) - A Mipedian Scout with long red hair. He has traveled beyond the desert where he has seen many sights including some that he'd wish he hadn't seen.
 Gintanai - A Mipedian Warbeast.
 Glost - A Mipedian Warbeast. He resembles a pink wolflike creature.
 Gnarlus - A Mipedian Warrior.
 Grantkae - A Mipedian Royal Elite. He served as a general for Prince Mudeenu's army.
 Headmaster Ankhyja - A Mipedian Stalker.
 Habekh - A Mipedian Conjurer.
 Ifjann - A Mipedian Muge.
 Iflar, the Crown Prince - A Mipedian Royal who leads the Mipedians in the absence of their reclusive King. His cousin Prince Mudeenu is next in line.
 Jorre - A Mipedian Stalker Muge.
 Jumbad - A Mipedian Minion Muge.
 Khenti - A Mipedian Stalker Warrior.
 Khorror - A Mipedian Warbeast. It resembles a large unspecified reptilelike monster.
 Kileron - A Mipedian Warbeast. It resembles a giant beetle-style creature.
 Kobarri - A Mipedian Royal Muge.
 Kojjbel - A Mipedian Warrior.
 Kolmo - A Mipedian Elite that resembles a chameleon.
 Lanker - A Mipedian Warrior.
 Majjcan - A Mipedian Elementalist.
 Maliph- A Mipedian Elite Warrior.
 Malvadine - A Mipedian Elite Warrior.
 Marquis Darini - A Mipedian Royal. He is the proponent of peace but staunch defender of Mipedian sovereignty.
 Melke - A Mipedian Stalker.
 Mizkio - A Mipedian Elite.
 Munnari - A Mipedian Stalker.
 Na-inna - A Mipedian Royal.
 Ninren - A Mipedian Warbeast. It resembles a giant thunder owl.
 Noaz - A Mipedian Stalker Warrior.
 Otinee - A Mipedian Scout.
 Owayki - The ghost of a Mipedian warrior that is neither dead or alive.
 Prince Mudeenu - A Mipedian Royal and Captain of the Guard. He is the cousin of Iflar.
 Qwun - A Mipedian Scout. He often uses his blinding speed to make up for his invisibility.
 Ranun - A Mipedian Conjurer.
 Raquanni - A Mipedian Muge.
 Rasbma Darini - A Mipedian Royal.
 Ribbian - A Mipedian Scout.
 Ruhban- A Mipedian Stalker Scout.
 Saand - A Mipedian Elite.
 Savell - A Mipedian Conjurer.
 Sepmek - A Mipedian Muge.
 Shimmark - A Mipedian Stalker.
 Shinadd - A Mipedian Scout.
 Siado - A Mipedian Stalker that finds out information for Prince Mudeenu. A personal friend of Peyton's who is occasionally giving Peyton admittance into the Mipedian Palace for scans.
 Silv - A Mipedian Elementalist who is a "Servant of Air."
 Sirri- A Mipedian Scout
 Sobtjek - A Mipedian Muge. He resembles a horned orange lizard in a purple hooded cape. When Sobtjek is sacrificed, the player can deal 25 damage to a targeted creature.
 Taffial - A Mipedian Royal Stalker.
 Tiaane (voiced by Mike Pollock) - A Mipedian Muge. He has studied Mugic with Najarin and is respected throughout the OverWorld.
 Tinnoi - A Mipedian Stalker Warrior.
 Titanix - A Mipedian Warbeast. He resembles a giant lamprey-style creature.
 Ubliqun - A Mipedian Stalker. He resembles a dragonoid creature with wings on his arms.
 Uboraan - A Mipedian Warbeast. It resembles a giant four-legged reptilian beast.
 Uro - A Mipedian Elementalist. It resembles a dragonoid creature.
 Vasquin - A Mipedian Muge.
 Vinta - A Mipedia Stalker. He has used his invisibility to defeat any invader that gets close to the Mipedim Oasis.
 Wistanne - A Mipedian Muge.
 Xelfe - A Mipedian Scout.
 Ylinné - A Mipedian ELite Warrior.
 Yterio - A Mipedian Warrior. Kaz and Peyton once covered for him in the Perithon.
 Zhade (voiced by Jason Griffith) - A Mipedian Scout that spies on other tribes.

Past Mipedians
 Ajara (voiced by Veronica Taylor) - A Past Mipedian Scout.
 General Masaba - A Past Mipedian Royal Elite.
 Ixxik - A Past Mipedian Warbeast that resembles a Tyrannosaurus with horns.
 Kehn-Sep - A Past Mipedian Royal.

Danians
The Danians are formicine insectoid creatures that live at Mount Pillar in the UnderWorld. Some have an ability to infect non-Danian creatures with Danian Parasites. Others have an ability which allows Danians to be sacrificed on their team in order to increase the strength of another Danian. This ability is called the "Hive" ability. Their Mugic is brown. Among the Danians are:

 Illexia - The Queen of the Danians that resembles a Queen ant. She is heavily protected by her Mandiblors from invaders.
 Agrino Jaldar - A Danian Warrior.
 Aimukk - A Danian Mandiblor. What he lacks in strength, he makes up with his willpower.
 Ambolx - A Danian Elementalist Muge.
 Aszil - A Danian Noble. She is the daughter of Queen Illexia and current queen of the Danians after Queen Illexia took the role elder of the hive.
 Aureban - A Danian Battlemaster.
 Balaan - A Danian Squadleader.
 Bierk - A Danian Squadleader.
 Chaac - A Danian Squadleader Minion.
 Daj Huun - A Danian Mandiblor.
 Dasalin - A Danian Mandiblor.
 Dhilas - A Danian Royal Muge.
 Drazz - A Danian Mandiblor Minion.
 Dubin - A Danian Controller.
 Ekuud - A Danian Squadleader who protects Queen Illexia. Ekuud's special ability enables Ekuud to gain 5 energy for each Mandiblor the player controls.
 Elhadd - A Danian Mandiblor Scout.
 Elna - A Danian Mandiblor Muge.
 Faash - A Danian Elementalist.
 Fliandar - A Danian Squadleader.
 Formicidor - A Danian Squadleader Scout. Due to his talents of roaming the UnderWorld, he knows some secrets of the UnderWorld that no other UnderWorlder knows.
 Galin - A Danian Mandiblor. He believes that he can speak with his Danian ancestors who haven't told him anything of good use.
 Gareep - A Danian Muge.
 Gazarbash - A Danian Squadleader.
 Ghundac - A Danian Squadleader Scout.
 Glapaal - A Danian Mandiblor Muge.
 Gorram - A Danian Noble Elementalist.
 Hammerdoom Chantcaller Assimilated - When the Danian Parasites infected Hammerdoom Chantcaller, he ends up turning into a Danian version of himself.
 Hermatred - A Danian Mandiblor Minion.
 Hiadrom - A Danian Mandiblor Warrior.
 Hota (voiced by Sean Schemmel) - A Danian Mandiblor Muge.
 Ibiaan - A Danian Mandiblor.
 Irrabeq - A Danian Mandiblor Minion.
 Ivelaan - A Danian Mandiblor.
 Jaal- A Danian Warrior.
 Junda - A Danian Squadleader.
 Kalanju - A Danian Squadleader.
 Kannen - A black-haired Danian Battlemaster in tattered-looking dark robes.
 Kapalor - A Danian Mandiblor Warrior.
 Katharaz - A Danian Elementalist.
 Kebna - A Danian Battlemaster with long arms and legs.
 Kelvedran - A Danian Mandiblor with wings.
 Keplaan - A Danian Battlemaster.
 Ketun - A Danian Mandiblor Elementalist Warrior.
 Khavaak - A Danian Muge.
 Khritlaan - A Danian Noble that wears a hooded robe. When Khritlaan is sent to the graveyard, the Mandiblors in the player's graveyard count as Mandiblors the player controls.
 Klencka - A Danian Mandiblor Minion.
 Kolmo Assimilated - Following a failed assassination attempt on Queen Illexia, Kolmo was infected with a Danian Parasite that causes Kolmo to turn into a Danian version of himself.
 Lendai - A Danian Squadleader.
 Lhad - A Danian Mandiblor.
 Lobanne - A Danian Mandiblor Muge.
 Lore - A Danian Muge in a brown hooded robe. Also known as the "High Muge of the Hive", Lore is rumored to be the most powerful Muge of the Danian tribe.
 Mahrrant - A Danian Mandiblor Muge.
 Makanaz - A Danian Mandiblor Warrior. He is a red version of Odu-Bathax, so it's unknown if they're related.
 Makrabon - A Danian Controller.
 Mallash - A Danian Battlemaster. His special ability enables him to gain 5 Energy for every Mandiblor that the player controls.
 Masilbaat - A Danian Battlemaster Muge.
 Mhein - A Danian Mandiblor Warrior.
 Mivindal - A Danian Battlemaster Minion.
 Nakal - A Danian Mandiblor.
 Necrabe - A Danian Noble.
 Neekwin - A Danian Mandiblor Elementalist.
 Nimmei- A Danian Noble.
 Nom - A Danian Elementalist who is a "Servant of Earth."
 Nunk'worn Assimilated - When the Danian Parasites end up infecting Nunk'worn, he ends up turning into a Danian version of himself.
 Odu-Bathax - A Danian Warrior who trains the new recruits for the army. He is also the defender of the North Gate at Mount Pillar.
 Orbaat - A Danian Muge.
 Ramarhvir - A Danian Noble Mandiblor Muge.
 Raznus Assimilated (voiced by David Wills) - Unbeknownst to Maxxor, the Danians have infected Raznus with a Danian Parasite that causes Raznus to turn into a Danian version of himself. He gained different abilities and stats.
 Rebant - A Danian Battlemaster Minion Muge.
 Riggan - A Danian Mandiblor Muge.
 Skartalas - A Danian Controller. It is said that he has had secret dealings with Lord Van Bloot and that their bitter feud is an act to hide their alliance. He can be sacrificed in order for the player to activate the Hive ability until the end of the turn.
 Tabaal - A Danian Mandiblor.
 Tarbok - A Danian Mandiblor.
 Tarin - A Danian Mandiblor Scout.
 Tarteme - A Danian Mandiblor.
 Tassanil - A Danian Noble Elementalist.
 Tharc - A Danian Noble Muge who is known to translate any tablet.
 Topar - A Danian Mandiblor Muge.
 Uholdan - A Danian Squadleader Minion.
 Ulmquad - A Danian Battlemaster Minion.
 Valanii Levaan - A Danian Noble. It is said that when his Squadleaders don't execute orders, Valanii Levaan orders executions. His special ability enables him to gain 10 Power for each Mandiblor the player controls.
 Valban - A Danian Warrior Elementalist.
 Vilrik Landfarer - A Danian Mandiblor Minion Elementalist.
 Vollash - A Danian Mandiblor that resembles a flying ant.
 Vunhra - A Danian Squadleader.
 Wamma (voiced by Darren Dunstan) - A lazy Danian Mandiblor that assists Sarah in navigating the inner workings of Mount Pillar. Wamma's special ability enables him to gain 5 energy for each Mandiblor the player controls.
 Yondaf - A Danian Controller.

Past Danians
In the past, Danians resembled giant insects.

 Makromil - A Past Danian Warrior. It resembles a giant dragonfly.

M'arrillians
The M'arrillians are a race of semi-aquatic energy creatures that have the ability of mind control and were also called the Deep Ones in "Chaotic: Now or Never." They reside behind the Doors of the Deep Mines. The Chieftains are the lead class of M'arrillians, Kha'ralls are crustacean and serve as blacksmiths, and Fluidmorphers can use Mugic and change their shape when a Creature on the battleboard Deals water damage. The M'arrillians also have Coral Fighters for their foot soldiers. Among the M'arrillians are:

 Aa'une - A M'arrillian Chieftain who was the leader of the M'arillians. Aa'une's projection form resembles a sea serpentlike creature with tentacled hair while his Avatar form can assume a translucent blue and pink-colored monster and a multi-headed monstrosity. During the fight against Maxxor, Chaor, and Iparu at Lake Bleekor where he is the only M'arrillian immune to its negation of mind control abilities, he was knocked into its waters and frozen there.
 Ab'lop - A M'arrillian that resembles an Anglerfish that became friends with Saand. Ab'lop is also the first Non-Hostile M'arrillian.
 Aer'dak - A M'arrillian Fluidmorpher.
 Anger'keem - A M'arrillian Fluidmorpher.
 Ast'imal - A M'arrillian Kha'rall.
 Aval'par - A M'arrillian Chieftain. It resembles an energy creature in gray armor and many tentacles.
 Bahrakatan - A M'arrillian Kha'rall.
 Blak'drin - A M'arrillian Kha'rall.
 Bo'aam - A M'arrillian Kha'rall.
 Dreg'ora - A M'arrillian Kha'rall Warrior.
 Dror'Niq - A M'arrillian Fluidmorpher.
 Ebenna'bakku - A M'arrillian Chieftain.
 Emna'ool - A M'arrillian Chieftain.
 Em'swa - A M'arrillian Fluidmorpher.
 Erakk'Tabb - A M'arrillian Chieftain.
 Fal'makin - A M'arrillian Chieftain.
 Fla'gamp - A M'arrillian Fluidmorpher.
 Gal'Drad - A M'arrillian Chieftain.
 Gan'nim - A M'arrillian Kha'rall.
 Gan'trak - A M'arrillian Chieftain.
 Ghar'lag - A M'arrillian Chieftain.
 Ginar'rash - A M'arrillian Kha'rall.
 Ihun'kalin - A M'arrillian Chieftain that was responsible for flooding Rao'pa Sahhk.
 Ikub'ra - A M'arrillian Kha'rall.
 Jus'hebban - A M'arrillian Chieftain.
 Ki'bro - A M'arrillian Chieftain.
 Klar'nok - A M'arrillian Chieftain.
 Klik'ssi - A M'arrillian Kha'rall.
 Lam'inkal - A M'arrillian Fluidmorpher Scout.
 Milla'iin - A M'arrillian Chieftain charged with the duty of flooding the UnderWorld. Milla'iin's special ability involves discarding two Mugic cards to destroy a targeted engaging creature with zero power.
 Mik'banin - A M'arrillian Kha'rall.
 Mock'adyn - A M'arrillian Fluidmorpher Muge with manta ray-style wings, humanoid arms, a set of tentacles, and a snakelike tail in place of legs.
 Neth'uar - A M'arrillian Chieftain.
 Nis'dabba - A M'arrillian Chieftain.
 Nunk'worn - A M'arrillian Fluidmorpher Warrior with draconic wings, two sets of tentacles, and a snakelike tail in place of legs.
 Part'soa - A M'arrillian Fluidmorpher.
 Phelphor - A M'arrillian creature in UnderWorld form when first discovered by Khybon and Jiggorex. He mutates into a hideous octopean creature that can produce tentacles from anywhere when exposed to water. He's listed in the card game as an UnderWorld Conqueror Scout and M'arrillian Fluidmorpher Scout.
 Rath'tab - A M'arrillian Chieftain. It resembles an energy creature in gray armor.
 Ritzu'dag - A M'arrillian Chieftain.
 Ri'oha - A M'arrillian Fluidmorpher
 Rol'doi - A M'arrillian Kha'rall Warrior.
 Siril'ean - A M'arrillian.
 Son'las - A M'arrillian Kha'rall Scout.
 Tir'baleen - A M'arrillian Fluidmorpher.
 Thar'lyn - A M'arrillian Elementalist with a Fluidmorpher appearance. When Lord Van Bloot attempted to gain asylum with the M'arrillians after fleeing from the UnderWorld, Thar'lyn oversaw Lord Van Bloot shoveling burnstones into Ri'oha's transmuting bath while demanding he go faster if he doesn't want him to send him back to Chaor.
 Vitar'zu - A M'arrillian Kha'rall.
 Vix'ben - A M'arrillian Fluidmorpher.
 Wilt'dred - A M'arrillian Chieftain.
 Xis'torq - A M'arrillian Chieftain.Past M'arrillians Pheren'tal - A Past M'arrillian from 2000 years ago who is hinted to be the tribe's ruler at the time
 Herat'lat - A Past M'arrillian Scout from 2000 years ago.
 M'ahadil - A Past M'arrillian Fluidmorpher from 2000 years ago.
 N'elyar - A Past M'arrillian Chieftain from 2000 years ago.
 Oban'emre - A Past M'arrillian who created the Mugic, Ostinato of Oban'emre.
 Rayan'tar - A Past M'arrillian from 2000 years ago.
 Teren'kar - A Past M'arrillian Fluidmorpher from 2000 years ago.
 X'arlon - A Past M'arrillian Chieftain from 2000 years ago.

Tribeless
The following creatures come from Prexxor Chasm and have not yet been defined into a tribe:

 Ariak - A Past Beast Muge that resembles a flying squirrel. His special ability is that when he is not in play, he can revive a creature.
 Cromaxx - A Past Warrior that resembles a caveman version of Maxxor. Cromaxx's special ability prevents him from being harmed by Mugic that reduces a creature's energy.
 Glektod - A Past Elementalist Warrior that resembles a spiky-shelled Glyptodon.
 Proboscar - A Past Beast that resembles a four-tusked woolly mammoth with a fanged mouth at the end of its trunk. Proboscar's special ability enables it to move into any unoccupied space as if it were adjacent.
 Smildon - A Past Warrior Beast that resembles a humanoid smilodon. Smildon's special ability can negate the abilities of any location.
 Ursis''' - A Past Warrior Muge that resembles a horned polar bear. In the show, Ursis has a special ability where it can be sacrificed so that the player can move any creature to any spot on the field.

Characters
Lists of fictional characters